Former United States special operations units are disbanded or otherwise dormant unconventional warfare units of the United States military. Most units were created to fulfil categorical obligations within a particular conflict, and were disbanded once that conflict ended. All branches of the United States armed forces – the Army, Navy, Marine Corps and Air Force have fielded special operations units. For subsisting special operations units, see United States Special Operations Forces.

The Civil War
 Jessie Scouts, Union Army scout unit that operated disguised as Confederate States Army soldiers

World War I
 American Expeditionary Forces (AEF)

World War II
 1st Alaskan Combat Intelligence Platoon (Provisional) - "Castner's Cutthroats"
 1st Special Service Force – "Devil's Brigade", a joint U.S.-Canadian unit
 5307th Composite Unit (Provisional) – "Merrill's Marauders" – "Charles N. Hunter" 
 Ranger Battalions
 Alamo Scouts
 Alaskan Scouts
 Marine Parachute Battalions – the "Paramarines"
 Marine Raider Battalions - the "Marine Raiders"
 United States Marine Corps Amphibious Reconnaissance Battalion, "VAC Amphib Recon Company" or "FMFPAC Amphib Recon Battalion"
 United States Marine Corps Scout (Tank) and Sniper Company – originated Scout Snipers and Division Recon
 Naval Scouts and Raiders
 Navy Combat Demolition Units (NCDU)
 US Navy Beach Jumpers
 Underwater Demolitions Teams (UDT) Precursor to the Navy SEALs
 1st Air Commando Group
 Office of Strategic Services, whose functions included the arming, training and supplying of resistance movements; the use of propaganda, espionage, and subversion; and conducting post-war planning. Precursor to the CIA.

Korean War
 Airborne Ranger Companies (Korean War)
 Air Resupply And Communications Service (ARCS)
 Combined Command Reconnaissance Activities, Korea (CCRAK) 
 Joint Advisory Commission, Korea (JACK) (Korean War), CIA-affiliated covert special operations unit
 United Nations Partisan Infantry Korea (UNPIK)

Vietnam War
 Fast Patrol Craft Patrol Craft Fast (PCF), also known as Swift Boats, were all-aluminum, 50-foot (15 m) long, shallow-draft vessels operated by the United States Navy for counterinsurgency (COIN) operations during the Vietnam War.
 Long Range Reconnaissance Patrols (LRRPs or "Lurps"); Vietnam War-era deep reconnaissance and raider units
 MIKE Force Mobile Strike Force Command; Corps I, II, III, IV
 Tiger Force (Vietnam War); reconnaissance commando (recondo) platoon in the 1/327th Infantry
 Project "Leaping Lena" (Vietnam War); Recondo course for South Vietnamese teams, trained by U.S. Special Forces, became Project DELTA.
 Project DELTA (Vietnam War); 5th Special Forces group long-range reconnaissance unit; precursor to MACV-SOG
 Military Assistance Command, Vietnam Studies and Observations Group (MACV-SOG), a joint covert Vietnam War-era task force composed of 2,000 American soldiers and over 8,000 indigenous mercenaries
 Project GAMMA/Project SIGMA MACV-SOG recon units that operated in Cambodia
 Project OMEGA Special Forces unit tasked to provide I Field Force Vietnam an SR capability in remote areas
 Phoenix Program; joint CIA and US military project based around the identification and elimination of the civilian supporters of the Viet Cong.
 Project 404/Palace dog was a USAF program that supplied support personnel in civilian clothing to the Royal Laotian Air Force. Long range goal was production of a self-sufficient RLAF.
 Raven FACs were USAF pilots in civilian clothing assigned to support the Royal Laotian Air Force by directing air strikes from small aircraft.

Other
39th Special Forces Detachment (1952–1984), in Berlin, Germany, a classified unit that conducted unconventional warfare during the cold war 
69th Special Forces Group (1963–1971), 8th Special Forces Group (1963–1972), 11th Special Forces Group (1961–1994) and 12th Special Forces Group (1961–1994) (disbanded Army Special Forces Groups)
 "Blue light", a counter-terrorist unit created among the 5th Special Forces Group in the late 1970s
 Special Operation - Reconnaissance, joint Marine-Navy reconnaissance units in the late 70s
 Task Force Bayonet, a Joint Task Force specialised in Foreign Internal Defense (FID) duties for Latin American countries; mainly composed of Special Forces, but also included United States Navy SEALs, Delta Force and Intelligence Support Activity operators
 US Army Special Operations Division
 SEASPRAY, an aviation unit for military covert operations during the 1980s
 Red Cell, U.S. "Tiger team" active in the 1980s
 Task Force Ranger (Operation Gothic Serpent), U.S Army Special Ops(75th Ranger Regiment, 3rd Ranger Battalion/ 160th SOAR/ Special Ops Detachment DELTA or Delta Force, now known as CAG)task force deployed to Somalia between August and October 1993
 Task Force 11 (Operation Enduring Freedom), joint Army/Navy task force created to capture or kill senior al-Qaeda and Taliban leaders in Afghanistan
 Task Force 20, Task Force 121 (Operation Iraqi Freedom), multinational joint task forces created to capture or kill senior leadership of the former Baathist regime in Iraq, including Saddam Hussein; also tasked with capturing or killing the leadership of the Iraqi insurgency as well as senior al-Qaeda operatives in Iraq; Task Force 20 later merged with Task Force 121, and is now believed to be active under the designation Task Force 77.
 Marine Corps Special Operations Command Detachment One (MCSOCOM-Det 1) (Operation Iraqi Freedom), pilot project active from 19 June 2003 to 10 March 2006 to assess the establishment of a permanent U.S. Marine Corps unit under Special Operations Command (SOCOM); replaced by the United States Marine Corps Forces Special Operations Command (MARSOC)
 Observer Group
 Marine Corps Test Unit#1

References
 http://www.specialoperations.net/Web%20Docs/Project404History.doc Accessed 11 October 2008.
 The Ravens: The Men Who Flew in America's Secret War in Laos. Christopher Robbins. Crown Publishers/Pocket Books, 1987.
 www.ravens.org Accessed 11 October 2008.

Special Operations Forces of the United States
Lists of defunct organizations